Seča is a settlement in the Municipality of Piran in the Littoral region of Slovenia.

Name
The Slovene name of the settlement was changed from Sveti Jernej (literally, 'Saint Bartholomew') to Seča in 1958. The name was changed on the basis of the 1948 Law on Names of Settlements and Designations of Squares, Streets, and Buildings as part of efforts by Slovenia's postwar communist government to remove religious elements from toponyms.

Church
The local church in the settlement is dedicated to Saint Bartholomew.

References

External links

 Seča on Geopedia
 Seča on Google Maps (map, photographs, street view)

Populated places in the Municipality of Piran
Slovenian Riviera